Wafaa Saed Bani Mustafa (born 1979) is the Jordanian Minister of Social Development. She was appointed as minister on 27 October 2022. Previously she had served as Minister of State for Legal Affairs from 11 October 2020 until 27 October 2022.

Education 
Mustafa holds a Master of Laws.

References 

1979 births
Living people
21st-century Jordanian politicians
Government ministers of Jordan
State ministers of Jordan